Beparoyaa (also spelled 'Beporoya') is a Bengali commercial film directed and produced by Pijush Saha, starring new face Rubel Das, Rano Joy and Papri Ghosh in lead roles. Beparoyaa was released on 15 January 2016. This film is presented by Prince Entertainment P4. Beparoyaa is a political satire and youth-based love story. The tag line of the film is

Synopsis
Ramlal Bhakat, who is also known as "Rambabu" (Rajatava Dutta), is the topmost don of Haldia. The entire locality runs at his command. Extortion, smuggling, promoting is his monopoly. In present days his influence in politics is proactive. With his help "Prakash Saha" (Supriyo Dutta) won the election to become an MLA. Mr. Prakash Saha is now a minister, but he is a puppet under Rambabu. "Raja", the only son of Rambabu, is the worthy son of his father. Women, alcohol, and unfair students' politics are his key area. Currently Rambabu is the chairman of a municipality. He did not dare to eliminate all the people who could have been obstacles to his activities. But even SP "Barun Debnath" has been murdered by Rambabu for the same. The assassination of Barun Debnath issue was flashed in the media.

Minister Prakash Saha advised Rambabu to leave the country for abroad and to hash out the issue with Rambabu’s closest rival "Sajid Vai", who has been arrested. New appointed SP "Bharat" (Koushik Banerjee) who is very close to Prakash Saha tries to cover up the case. Young brave boy "Surya" (Rubel Das) who is under police training got entangled in various cases which dragged him into court. To avoid the situation Surys’s father deported him to Haldia at his maternal uncle’s place, where he meets "Bristi" (Papri) and falls in love with her. He proposed to Bristi, but Bristi was not ready to accept. Raja who was also inclined toward Bristi tries to get her forcefully, but Surya came to know about it and stood beside Bristi, leading into a fight between Surya and Raja. Raja was injured and went into a coma. Hearing the news Rambabu came to Haldia and got into a direct tussle with Surya. At the end Surya won the battle against Rambabu and Bristi submitted to him.
M P

Cast
Rubel Das as Surya
Papri Ghosh as Bristi
Rajatava Dutta as Rambabu
Supriyo Dutta as Prakash Saha
Shantilal Mukherjee as Arun
Kaushik Banerjee as SP Bharat
Arun Banerjee as Professor
Dolon Roy as Hero’s Maternal Aunt
Rano Joy
Master Prayus Raj as Gablu

Soundtrack

References

2016 films
Bengali-language Indian films
2010s Bengali-language films